A nephridiopore is part of the nephridium, an excretory organ found in many organisms, such as flatworms and annelids. Polychaetes typically release their gametes into the water column using nephridiopores.
 
Nephridia are homologous to nephrons or uriniferous tubules found in the kidney of humans. Nephridiopores are present in ventral region. The nephridium consists of an opening called the nephrostome, a long convoluted tubule, and another opening called the nephridiopore. Body fluids are filtered in through the nephrostome and passed through the convoluted tubule system. Essential substances are reabsorbed through active mechanisms and waste products are secreted back into the lumen of the tube. The resulting excretory fluid or urine is passed out through the nephridiopore.

References

Platyhelminth anatomy
Annelid anatomy